Shanghai Ghetto is a 2002 documentary film produced and directed by Dana Janklowicz-Mann and Amir Mann. Narrated by Martin Landau, the film chronicles the story of Jewish refugees fleeing Nazi Germany in the 1930s and their lives in the Shanghai Ghetto.

The film was awarded the Audience Choice Award and the Human Rights Award at the 2002 Santa Barbara International Film Festival.

See also

A Jewish Girl in Shanghai

External links
Shanghai Ghetto Official site
 
  
 
  
 

Documentary films about refugees
Jewish Japanese history
Jews and Judaism in Shanghai
Films set in Shanghai